Mario Thembeka Masuku (October 1951 – 11 January 2021) was a Swazi politician who was the leader of the People's United Democratic Movement (PUDEMO), Eswatini's banned opposition party.

Early life and education
He was born in the village of Makhosini located in Nhlangano Eswatini and attended Evelyn Baring High School.

Imprisonment for political activity
The Royal Swazi Police arrested and imprisoned Masuku at Matsapha maximum security prison on charges of sedition in 2001.

He was arrested again on November 15, 2008, under the Suppression of Terrorism Act of 2008. At the funeral of Musa Dlamini, who died while supposedly trying to bomb the Lozitha bridge, Masuku is alleged to have verbally supported recent bombings of government institutions. He was acquitted and discharged at the High Court on September 21, 2009 after spending 340 days in prison.

On 1 May 2014, Masuku, after a making a speech at a May day rally in Manzini, was arrested together with student activist Maxwell Dlamini. They were charged with terrorism and sedition. A widely supported international campaign for their release was started shortly thereafter.

He died on 11 January 2021, from COVID-19.

References

External links
 Mario Masuku: 'A brief autobiography'
 Mario Masuku meets with senior Danish politician Mogens Lykketoft
 International campaign for the release of Mario Masuku

1951 births
2021 deaths
People's United Democratic Movement members
Prisoners and detainees of Eswatini
Swazi democracy activists
Swazi prisoners and detainees
Deaths from the COVID-19 pandemic in Eswatini

He stepped down as president of PUDEMO, and handed over the role to a young leader, Mlungisi Makhanya.